Sonagachi is a neighbourhood in Kolkata, India, located in North Kolkata near the intersection of Jatindra Mohan Avenue (north of C.R. Avenue) with Beadon Street and Sovabazar, about one kilometer north of the Marble Palace area. Sonagachi is among the largest red-light districts in Asia with several hundred multi-storey brothels residing more than 16,000 commercial sex workers.

Etymology
In Bengali, Sona Gachi means 'Tree of Gold'. According to legend, during the early days of Calcutta the area was the den of a notorious dacoit by the name of Sanaullah, who lived here with his mother. On his death, the grieving woman is said to have heard a voice coming from their hut, saying, “Mother, don’t cry. I have become a Gazi”, and so the legend of Sona Gazi started. The mother built a mosque in memory of her son, although it fell into disrepair. The Sona Gazi was converted into Sonagachi.

Red-light district

Current situation
Several NGOs and government organizations operate in Sonagachi for the prevention of sexually transmitted diseases (STD) including AIDS. The book Guilty Without Trial by the founders of the NGO Sanlaap based much of their research into human trafficking in India on this area.

The Sonagachi project is a sex workers' cooperative that operates in the area and empowers sex workers to insist on condom use and to stand up against abuse. Run by the Durbar Mahila Samanwaya Committee, it was founded by public health scientist Smarajit Jana in 1992 but is now largely run by the prostitutes themselves. While some are crediting the DMSC with keeping a relatively low rate of HIV infection among prostitutes, around 5.17% of the 13,000 prostitutes in Sonagachi are estimated to be HIV positive. This rate is close to the average HIV rate for female prostitutes in India, which is estimated to be 5.1%, though the HIV infection rate among prostitutes as well as among the general population varies widely by region in India. According to some sources, prostitutes from Sonagachi who test HIV positive are not told about the results, and live with the disease without knowing about it "because the DMSC is worried that HIV positive women will be ostracized." Some prostitutes in Sonagachi have stated that "the clients, at least three quarters of them" refuse to use condoms and "if we force them to use the condom, they will just go next door. There are so many women working here, and in the end, everyone is prepared to work without protection for fear of losing trade.”

Besides the Sonagachi project, the DMSC also runs several similar projects in West Bengal, organizing some 65,000 prostitutes and their children. The organization lobbies for the recognition of sex workers' rights and full legalization, runs literacy and vocational programs, and provides micro loans. The DMSC hosted India's first national convention of sex workers on 14 November 1997 in Kolkata, titled 'Sex Work is Real Work: We Demand Workers Rights'. The book Half the Sky: Turning Oppression into Opportunity for Women Worldwide reports investigations revealing that, contrary to stated policy, the DMSC allows sex slavery, trafficking, and underage girls in Sonagachi project brothels.

Popular culture
The documentary Born into Brothels: Calcutta's Red Light Kids won the Oscar for best documentary award in 2005. It depicts the lives of children born to prostitutes in Sonagachi. Born into Brothels takes the viewer beyond the well-known prostitute-clogged streets and into the homes of the children who live in the so-called worst place on earth. If the film has one success story, it is the discovery of ten-year-old Avijit whose natural affinity for creating exciting compositions through the lens earned him an invitation to the World Press Photo Foundation in Amsterdam.

Sahir Ludhianavi wrote 

Ye duniya do rangi hai

Ek taraf se resham ode, ek taraf se nangi hai 

Ek taraf andhi daulat ki paagal aish parasti

Ek taraf jismoñ ki qeemat roti se bhi sasti

Ek taraf hai Sonaagaachi, ek taraf Chaurangi hai

Ye duniya do rangi hai

Meaning:

This world is double-faced

One side covered with silk, the other naked

On the one hand, the hedonism of blind wealth

On the other, bodies sold cheaper than  bread

On the one hand lies Sonagachi, on the other Chowringhee

This world is double-faced

There is also a documentary titled Tales of The Night Fairies by Prof. Shohini Ghosh and Dr. Sabeena Ghadioke from Asia's leading Media institute AJK, Mass Communication Research Centre, about the Sonagachi area. It has won the Jeevika Award for the best documentary feature on livelihood in India.

Popular actor Kamal Haasan's movie Mahanadhi has a storyline based on the area. The Malayalam Film Calcutta News depicts the story of women being trafficked and forced to become sex workers in Sonagachi.

In his documentary The Five Obstructions, renowned Danish filmmaker Lars von Trier asks poet and experimental filmmaker Jorgen Leth to name the worst place in the world he has ever visited, and immediately Leth responds with "The Red Light District of Calcutta."

See also
  
 Prostitution in India
 Prostitution in Asia 
 Prostitution in Kolkata 
 Prostitution in Mumbai 
 All Bengal Women's Union
 Durbar Mahila Samanwaya Committee 
 Kamathipura 
 Garstin Bastion Road, New Delhi
 Budhwar Peth, Pune 
 Male prostitution

References

Further reading 

 Dutta, Debolina, and Oishik Sircar. “Notes on Unlearning: Our Feminisms, Their Childhoods.” In Feminism and the Politics of Childhood: Friends or Foes?, edited by Rachel Rosen and Katherine Twamley, 83–90. UCL Press, 2018.  
 Open Society Foundations. “Sex Worker Health and Rights: Where Is the Funding?” Open Society Foundations, 2006.  
 Wright, Andrea. “‘The Immoral Traffic in Women’: Regulating Indian Emigration to the Persian Gulf.” In Borders and Mobility in South Asia and Beyond, edited by Reece Jones and Md. Azmeary Ferdoush, 145–66. Amsterdam University Press, 2018.  
 
 
 Ghose, Toorjo, Dallas T. Swendeman, and Sheba M. George. “The Role of Brothels in Reducing HIV Risk in Sonagachi, India.” Qualitative Health Research 21, no. 5 (May 2011): 587–600.  
 Newman, Peter A. “Reflections on Sonagachi: An Empowerment-Based HIV-Preventive Intervention for Female Sex Workers in West Bengal, India.” Women’s Studies Quarterly 31, no. 1/2 (2003): 168–79.  
  
 Cornish, Flora, and Riddhi Banerjee. “How Do Relationships Between Peer Educators and Sex Workers Lead to Increased Condom Use?: A Social Capital Interpretation of the Sonagachi Project.” Indian Anthropologist 43, no. 1 (2013): 51–64.  
 Jana S, Basu I, Rotheram-Borus MJ, Newman PA. The Sonagachi Project: a sustainable community intervention program. AIDS Educ Prev. 2004 Oct;16(5):405-14. . .
 Karan A, Hansen N. Does the Stockholm Syndrome affect female sex workers? The case for a "Sonagachi Syndrome". BMC Int Health Hum Rights. 2018 Feb 6;18(1):10. . ; .
 Ghose T, Swendeman D, George S, Chowdhury D. Mobilizing collective identity to reduce HIV risk among sex workers in Sonagachi, India: the boundaries, consciousness, negotiation framework. Soc Sci Med. 2008 Jul;67(2):311-20. . Epub 2008 May 1. ; .
 Gangopadhyay DN, Chanda M, Sarkar K, Niyogi SK, Chakraborty S, Saha MK, Manna B, Jana S, Ray P, Bhattacharya SK, Detels R. Evaluation of sexually transmitted diseases/human immunodeficiency virus intervention programs for sex workers in Calcutta, India. Sex Transm Dis. 2005 Nov;32(11):680-4. . ; .
 Swendeman D, Basu I, Das S, Jana S, Rotheram-Borus MJ. Empowering sex workers in India to reduce vulnerability to HIV and sexually transmitted diseases. Soc Sci Med. 2009 Oct;69(8):1157-66. . Epub 2009 Aug 28. ; .
 Fehrenbacher AE, Chowdhury D, Ghose T, Swendeman D. Consistent Condom Use by Female Sex Workers in Kolkata, India: Testing Theories of Economic Insecurity, Behavior Change, Life Course Vulnerability and Empowerment. AIDS Behav. 2016 Oct;20(10):2332-2345. . Erratum in: AIDS Behav. 2017 Dec 4;: ; . 
 Swendeman D, Fehrenbacher AE, Ali S, George S, Mindry D, Collins M, Ghose T, Dey B. "Whatever I have, I have made by coming into this profession": the intersection of resources, agency, and achievements in pathways to sex work in Kolkata, India. Arch Sex Behav. 2015 May;44(4):1011-23. . Epub 2015 Jan 13. ; .
 Rami Chhabra. “More on Sonagachi.” Economic and Political Weekly, vol. 42, no. 18, Economic and Political Weekly, 2007, pp. 1582–1582, .
 Nag, Moni. “Sex Workers in Sonagachi: Pioneers of a Revolution.” Economic and Political Weekly, vol. 40, no. 49, Economic and Political Weekly, 2005, pp. 5151–56, .
 GHOSE, TOORJO. “Politicizing Political Society: Mobilization among Sex Workers in Sonagachi, India.” South Asian Feminisms, edited by ANIA LOOMBA and RITTY A. LUKOSE, Duke University Press, 2012, pp. 285–305, .
 Kotiswaran, Prabha. “Born Unto Brothels: Toward a Legal Ethnography of Sex Work in an Indian Red-Light Area.” Law & Social Inquiry, vol. 33, no. 3, [ American Bar Foundation, Wiley], 2008, pp. 579–629, .
 Dasgupta, Simanti. “Sovereign Silence: Immoral Traffic (Prevention) Act and Legalizing Sex Work in Sonagachi.” Political and Legal Anthropology Review, vol. 37, no. 1, [Wiley, American Anthropological Association], 2014, pp. 109–25, .

Bibliography

External links
 Report on Sonagachi, critical of DMSC, by Tom Vater, The Irish Independent, 2004.
 The Red Lights of Sonagachi Positive Nation, Dec 2003/Jan 2004; issue 85/86
 Report on the Dunbar NGO, India Travel Times
 The Sex Workers, 2004 PBS Frontline documentary comparing anti-HIV efforts in Mumbai and Kolkata
 Giving AIDS the Red Light, The Village Voice, 18 September 2002
 Changing prices for sex work in Sonagachi, a Kolkata red-light district
  Living with dignity: an international development cooperation story  for the Wikibook  Development Cooperation Handbook 

Prostitution in India 
Neighbourhoods in Kolkata
Red-light districts in India